Some notable institutions celebrating film, including both national film institutes and independent and non-profit organizations. For the purposes of this list, institutions that do not have their own article on Wikipedia are not considered notable.

 American Film Institute
 Asia Pacific Film Institute
 Asian Academy of Film & Television
 Australian Film Institute
 British Film Institute 
 Canadian Film Institute 
 Danish Film Institute
 Doha Film Institute
 Film and Television Institute of India
 Finnish Film Foundation
 Irish Film Institute
 K. R. Narayanan National Institute of Visual Science and Arts
 Mowelfund Film Institute
 Norwegian Film Institute
 Satyajit Ray Film and Television Institute
 Sundance Institute 
 Swedish Film Institute
 University of the Philippines Film Institute

See also

List of film schools and programs

 Institutes
Lists of organizations